The 2011 Latin American Table Tennis Cup was held at the Ginásio do Maracanãzinho in Rio de Janeiro, Brazil from March 17–19, 2011. The event was a qualifier for the 2011 Table Tennis World Cup. It was the first edition of the event, organized by the International Table Tennis Federation, Latin American Table Tennis Union, Brazilian Table Tennis Confederation, and TMS International. Brazilian Gustavo Tsuboi won the men's event and the women's was won by the Dominican Wu Xue.

Seeds
Seeds were based on the ITTF World Ranking lists published in March 2011.

 Men's Competition
  - LATTU Ranking 1
  - 2010 Latin American Champion
  - South American Champion
  - LATTU Ranking 2
  - Host representative
  - LATTU Ranking 3
  - U-18 Latin American Champion
  - LATTU Ranking 4
  - Central American Champion
  - LATTU Ranking 5
  - LATTU Ranking 6
  - LATTU Junior wild card

 Women's Competition
  - LATTU Ranking 1
  - LATTU Ranking 2
  - South American Champion
  - 2010 Latin American Champion
  - U-18 Latin American Champion
  - LATTU Ranking 3
  - Host representative
  - LATTU Ranking 4
  - LATTU Junior wild card
  - LATTU Ranking 5
  - Central American Champion
  - LATTU Ranking 6

Men's competition
In the semi-finals, Brazil's Gustavo Tsuboi defeated Liu Song 4-3, and Paraguay's Marcelo Aguirre won over Cazuo Matsumoto 4-1. In the final, Aguirre lost to Tsuboi. Tsuboi's win qualified him for the 2011 Liebherr Men's World Cup.

Qualification round

Group 1

Group 2

Group 3

Group 4

Main Draw Bracket

Women's competition
In the semi-finals, Dominican Wu Xue defeated Paula Medina 4-2, and Mexican Yadira Silva beat Jessica Yamada 4-3. Wu won the women's competition after defeating Silva, qualifying for the 2011 Volkswagen Women's World Cup and winning the US $2,000 prize.

Qualification round

Group 1

Group 2

Group 3

Group 4

Main Draw Bracket

See also
 Latin American Table Tennis Cup

References

Latin American Table Tennis Cup
International sports competitions in Rio de Janeiro (city)
Latin American Table Tennis Cup
Latin American Table Tennis Cup
Latin American Table Tennis Cup